James David McGovern (born February 5, 1965) is an American professional golfer who has played on the PGA Tour and the Nationwide Tour.

Early life 
McGovern was born in Teaneck, New Jersey. He grew up in Oradell, New Jersey in a house adjoining the Hackensack Golf Club. McGovern attended Bergen Catholic High School and was a star football player there. However, a coach introduced him to golf during his junior year.

Amateur career 
McGovern initially attended the University of Arkansas as a non-scholarship member of its golf team. He transferred after two years to Old Dominion University in Norfolk, Virginia and was a member of that school's golf team. He turned pro in 1988 and joined the PGA Tour in 1991.

Professional career 
McGovern was a member of the PGA Tour from 1991–1998. His career year was 1993 when he won once, had two other top-10 finishes, earned $587,495 and finished 27th on the money list. His best finish in a major was T5 at the 1994 Masters Tournament. He had 14 career top-10 finishes in 386 PGA Tour events.

McGovern finished 19th in qualifying school and earned his PGA Tour card for 2008; he made the cut in 11 of 26 events. In 2009, he was back on the Nationwide Tour.

On January 1, 2011, McGovern became the head golf professional at White Beeches Golf & Country Club in Haworth, New Jersey, 20 miles from midtown Manhattan. He is one of the few PGA Professionals who was also a PGA Tour winner.

On May 17, 2011, McGovern earned medalist honors at the local U.S. Open qualifier. His 4-under 68 at Ballyowen Golf Club gave him medalist honors by two strokes and also secured for him one of five spots available for the U.S. Open sectional qualifier at Canoe Brook on June 6. McGovern earned a spot in the 2014 PGA Championship through his finish at the PGA Professional National Championship after having to qualify in a playoff for one of the twenty positions. He occasionally continues to compete at senior major events and those sanctioned through the New Jersey section of the PGA of America.

Personal life 
McGovern lives in Oradell, New Jersey. His brother, Rob McGovern, played linebacker in the NFL.

Amateur wins
1987 Virginia State Intercollegiate Championship
1988 Metropolitan Amateur

Professional wins (9)

PGA Tour wins (1)

*Note: The 1993 Shell Houston Open was shortened to 54 holes due to rain.

PGA Tour playoff record (1–0)

Ben Hogan Tour wins (3)

Ben Hogan Tour playoff record (1–0)

Other wins (5)
1987 Metropolitan Open (as an amateur)
1994 Diners Club Matches (with Jeff Maggert)
2015 New Jersey Senior Open
2016  New Jersey Senior Open, Metropolitan Senior Open

Results in major championships

CUT = missed the half-way cut
"T" = tied

See also
1990 Ben Hogan Tour graduates
1991 PGA Tour Qualifying School graduates
1996 PGA Tour Qualifying School graduates
1997 PGA Tour Qualifying School graduates
2007 PGA Tour Qualifying School graduates

References

External links

American male golfers
Arkansas Razorbacks men's golfers
PGA Tour golfers
Korn Ferry Tour graduates
Golfers from New Jersey
Bergen Catholic High School alumni
Old Dominion University alumni
People from Teaneck, New Jersey
People from Oradell, New Jersey
Sportspeople from Bergen County, New Jersey
1965 births
Living people